Gobbler is a 1981 clone of Pac-Man for the Apple II, published by On-Line Systems (later to become Sierra Entertainment). It was programmed by Olaf Lubeck who also wrote Cannonball Blitz (1982) for the Apple II, a clone of Donkey Kong.

Gameplay
The player uses the arrow keys to move the character left and right, and the A and Z keys to move up or down.  Each dot is worth five points, while pieces of fruit (cherries, an apple and a lime) are each worth 200.  Consuming the white pellets makes the four ghosts vulnerable for a short time, during which they are colored green and can be eaten (earning 200 points for the first, 400 for the second, etc.).

References

1981 video games
Apple II games
Apple II-only games
North America-exclusive video games
Pac-Man clones
Video games about food and drink
Video games developed in the United States